Thaipusam or Thaipoosam is a Tamil Hindu festival celebrated on the full moon of the Tamil month of Thai (January/February), usually coinciding with Pushya star, known as Pusam in Tamil. 

The festival commemorates the legend of the goddess Parvati offering her son, Murugan (Kartikeya) a vel (a divine spear) so he could vanquish the asura Surapadman and his brothers. It is also commonly believed that Thaipusam marks Murugan's birthday; though some other sources suggest that the date of Vaikasi Visakam, which falls on the Vaikasi month (May/June), is Murugan's birthday.

Thaipusam is mainly observed in countries where there is a significant presence of Tamil community such as India, Malaysia, Mauritius, as well as other places where ethnic Tamils reside as a part of the local Indian diaspora population such as Canada, Singapore, South Africa, the United States, Réunion, Indonesia, Thailand, Myanmar, Trinidad and Tobago, Guyana, Suriname, Jamaica and the other parts of the Caribbean.

It is a national holiday in many countries such as Malaysia and Mauritius. In India its a state holiday in Tamil Nadu. In certain states of Malaysia and in the nations of Mauritius, it is also a government and a bank holiday.

Etymology 
The name Thaipusam is a portmanteau of the name of the Tamil month of Thai, and the name of the star, Pusam, the Tamil rendering of the Sanskrit Pushya. This particular star is at its highest point during the festival. The name of the star is rendered Pooyam in Malayalam.

Legend

According to the Kanda Puranam, the Tamil iteration of the Skanda Purana, three asuras (a race of celestial beings) named Surapadman, Tarakasuran, Singamukhan performed austerities to propitiate Shiva. The deity granted them various boons, including the ability to conquer the three worlds, as well as immortality. The three brothers subsequently oppressed the celestial deities known as the devas and started a reign of injustice and tyranny in their respective realms. When the deities pleaded Shiva for his assistance, he manifested five additional heads, and a divine spark emerged from each of them. Each spark developed into a baby boy, raised by the maidens known as the krrtikas (personifications of the Pleiades). When they were embraced by Parvati, the six boys fused into one, and the six-headed Murugan was born. Parvati granted him a divine spear, known as the vel. Accompanied by Virabahu, his commander-in-chief, the former's eight brothers, as well as the forces of the devas, the deity waged war on the asura brothers. In the final phase of the conflict, Murugan battled Surapadman, who employed his magical arts to fight the deity. Murugan split the asura in two with his divine spear. Having been granted immortality, the two halves of the asura transformed into a mango tree and retreated to the ocean, intending to overwhelm the earth. When the deity bisected the tree, the asura turned into a peacock and a rooster. Murugan decided to adopt the peacock as his mount, and take on the rooster as his flag.

Murugan is a deity associated with yogic discipline and austerities, and is regarded by his adherents to be capable of offering mukti (spiritual liberation) to all those who venerate him.

Kavadi Attam
The Kavadi Attam ("kavadi dance") is a ceremonial act of devotional sacrifice through dance, food offerings, and bodily self-mortification. It is often performed by devotees during the festival of Thaipusam in honor of Murugan. The kavadi is a semicircular, decorated canopy supported by a wooden rod that the pilgrim carries on their shoulders to the temple. The devotee makes the pilgrimage (the nadai payanam) with bare feet, bearing food offerings on the kavadi.  Depending on the location of the temple, this walk to the temple can take more than a week. The temple of Murugan in Palani is a popular destination, as it is one among the arupadai veedu ("six houses" - the sites sacred to Murugan). The Palani Murugan temple also has a reputation as a place of healing. Bogar (an ancient siddhar and devotee of Murugan) made the statue of Murugan in Palani, with the mixture of several sidhha medicines.

Devotees prepare for the celebration by keeping their body always clean, doing regular prayers, following a vegetarian diet and fasting before the Thaipusam. Kavadi-bearers have to perform elaborate ceremonies at the time of assuming the kavadi and at the time of offering it to Murugan. The kavadi-bearer observes celibacy and consumes only certain types of foods known as satvik food, once a day, while continuously thinking of God. On the day of the festival, devotees shave their heads and undertake a pilgrimage along a set route, while engaging in various acts of devotion, notably carrying the various types of kavadi. The devotees believe that worshiping lord Murugan every year in this way makes them physically and mentally healthy, and helps clear them of karmic debts they may have incurred.

At its simplest, the pilgrimage may entail walking the route carrying a pot of milk, but mortification of the flesh by piercing the skin, tongue or cheeks with vel skewers is also common. In addition, some pierce their tongues or cheeks, all the way through, with a small spear.

A similar practice is performed by the Nagarathar community in Pazhani, India. This is known as the Nagarathar Kavadi.

Thaipusam in India 

In Palani Arulmigu Dhandayuthapani temple, 10 day Festival (Brahmotsavam) is held during Thaipusam. Thirukalyanam (Celestial Wedding) will be held on the day before Thaipusam. On Thaipusam, Therottam will be held. Lord Muthukumaraswamy will bless devotees in Thanga Kuthirai Vahanam (Golden Horse), Periya Thanga Mayil Vahanam (Golden Peacock), Theppotsavam (Float Festival) during the 10 day festival.

In Chidamabaram (Thillai) Panchamurthi Veedhi Ula, Thirthavari, Thaandava Darsanam Aarthi will be held on Thaipusam. In Madurai Sri Meenakshi Amman Temple, Sri Meenakshi Sundareshwarar Theppotsavam (Float Festival) will be held at Mariammam Theppa Kulam. In Mylapore Kapaleeswarar Temple, 3 Day Theppotsavam will be held during Thaipusam Pournami.

In Sri Subrahmanya Swamy Temple of Bangalore, thaipoosam is conducted during this auspicious' month and day of every year. This is now more than 50 years (in 2019, they celebrated golden jubilee year)

The festival is also observed as Thaipooyam Mahotsavam in the Shree Subrahmanya Temple in Alappuzha, Kerala.

Outside India
Outside India, Thaipusam celebrations also takes place in  countries such as Malaysia, the United States, Mauritius, South Africa and Singapore.

It is a public holiday in several states in Malaysia. In Malaysia, the temple at Batu Caves, near Kuala Lumpur  & Arulmigu Balathandayuthapani Temple, Penang near George Town, Penang & Nattukkottai Chettiar Temple, Penang and Kallumalai Murugan Temple, Ipoh, Perak, often attracts over one million devotees and tens of thousands of tourists.

In Singapore, Hindu devotees start their procession at the Sri Srinivasa Perumal Temple in the early morning, carrying milk pots as offerings or attaching "kavadis" and spikes pierced on their body. The procession travels for 4 kilometres before finishing at Tank Road, Sri Thendayuthapani Temple.

Thaipusam in Mauritius is celebrated with thousands of attendees taking Cavadee. While the festival is celebrated across the country, the grandest one is always at Kovil Montagne (Sri Siva Subramanya Thirukovil). 
Nestled in Corps de Garde Mountain in Quatre Bornes, it was founded in 1890 by a humble and pious Tamil Indian immigrant, Velamurugan.

Also celebrated at nearby islands of  Seychelles and Reunion

Thaipusam Kavady ceremony is celebrated in cities of Durban (Clairwood Shree Siva Soobramonior Temple, Cape Town and Shree Sivasubramaniar Alayam of Palm Ridge in South Africa.

At Fiji, the Thaipusam Festival is celebrated at Sri Siva Subrahmanya Swami Temple, Nadi Town.

In Indonesia, the procession mainly held in the capital of North Sumatra province, Medan and Palani Andawer Temple, Aceh. On the eve of Thaipusam, the Hindus gathered together at Sree Soepramaniem Nagarattar Temple at Kejaksaan Road to accompanying a 125 years old chariot or locally known as Radhoo from the temple to the main temple 
nearby (about ) at Sri Mariamman Temple at Kampung Madras which opens 24-hours for the festival. The kavadi procession are also happening at the day, but it takes on different temples around Medan and other parts in the province depends on them celebrate it.

In the United States of America, the Shiva Murugan Temple in Concord, California celebrates the Thaipoosam preceded by a walk. Over 2000 people participated in the walk for last several years. The temple also organizes walks on other Murugan Festivals such as Vaikasi Visakam.

Gallery

See also
 Hinduism in Southeast Asia
 Hinduism in Malaysia and Singapore
 Indians in Malaysia and Singapore
 Thai Poosam Kavady

References

Festivals in Tamil Nadu
Hindu festivals
Religion in Malaysia
Hinduism in Singapore
Tamil festivals
January observances
February observances
Kaumaram
Religious festivals in India
Hindu festivals in Nepal
Religious festivals in Malaysia
Religious festivals in Mauritius
Religious festivals in South Africa
Religious festivals in Guadeloupe
Religious festivals in Réunion
Religious festivals in Indonesia
Religious festivals in Thailand
Religious festivals in Myanmar
Observances held on the full moon
Articles containing video clips